This is a list of prefects of Požega-Slavonia County.

Prefects of Požega-Slavonia County (1993–present)

See also
Požega-Slavonia County

Notes

External links
World Statesmen - Požega-Slavonia County

Požega-Slavonia County